The Portuguese Settlement (Saint John's Village;) is an area of Ujong Pasir in, Malacca, Malaysia, which serves as a home for the Kristang people. The Kristang people are a Malaysian ethnic group with mixed Portuguese and Malay heritage, originating from the time of the Portuguese rule in Malacca (16th to 17th century).

In 1933, 11 hectares of land at Malacca were purchased with the purpose of creating a haven for the scattered Kristang people. The swampy land was cleared and 10 wooden houses with earth floors and attap roofs were built. Saint John's village, as that simple fishing village was originally known, soon attracted additional Kristang from other areas of Malacca, and grew to become one of Malacca's main tourist attractions, improving the standard of living of its villagers.

Like many other Portuguese-speaking communities around the world, the Portuguese Settlement holds a yearly "June festival" that opens with Festa de São João ("Feast of Saint John", June 23) and closes with Festa de São Pedro ("Feast of Saint Peter", the fishermen's patron saint, June 29). This festival is attended by about 100,000 visitors from Malaysia and abroad. At the festival one can hear Kristang folk songs and watch dancers in colourful costumes perform to the rhythm of branyu music. An important event in the festival is the blessing of the local fishermen's boats, specially decorated for the occasion, to assure good catch.

References

External links 
 Chapter 7 - The Luso-Asiatic Communities
 Malacca's Portuguese community : Rocking along the Sand's Edge

Ethnic enclaves in Malaysia
Kristang people
Geography of Malacca
Portuguese neighborhoods
Portuguese Malacca
Tourist attractions in Malacca